William Mabane, 1st Baron Mabane  (12 January 1895 – 16 November 1969), known as Sir William Mabane between 1954 and 1962, was a British businessman and Liberal/National Liberal politician.

Background and education
The son of Joseph Greenwood Mabane and Margaret (née Steele) of Leeds, he was educated at Woodhouse Grove School and at Gonville and Caius College, Cambridge. He was commissioned in 1914 and served in the Near East and France in World War I as a captain with the East Yorkshire Regiment; he was wounded and mentioned in despatches. He later became a businessman and merchant.

Political career
Mabane was elected Member of Parliament (MP) for Huddersfield in 1931 and lost his seat in 1945. Mabane's exact party label was confused for much of his time in the Commons. His local Liberal association was affiliated to the official Liberals until 1939, but Mabane was frequently listed as being a National Liberal, which he repeatedly sought to deny, despite supporting the National Government when the official Liberals had ceased to. He lost his seat to Labour in 1945, when he was opposed by an official Liberal candidate, Roy Harrod. The standard authoritative work by F.W.S. Craig indicates he was a National Liberal throughout his tenure, as does the contemporary Times Guide to the House of Commons. The town remained an area of strength for liberals and at the 1950 general election, the Liberal Donald Wade won Huddersfield West in a straight fight against Labour.

He entered the government as Assistant Postmaster-General under Neville Chamberlain in September 1939, an office he only held until October, when he was made Minister for Home Security. When Winston Churchill succeeded Chamberlain as Prime Minister in May 1940, Mabane was appointed Parliamentary Secretary to the Home Department, a post he held jointly with Ellen Wilkinson from October of that year. He later served under Churchill as Parliamentary Secretary to the Ministry of Food from 1942 to 1945 and as Minister of State for Foreign Affairs between May and July 1945.

He was sworn of the Privy Council in the 1944 New Year Honours and a Knight Commander of the Order of the British Empire (KBE) in 1954. In 1962 he was raised to the peerage as Baron Mabane, of Rye in the County of Sussex. He was tenant of Lamb House, the National Trust property in Rye, East Sussex.

Apart from his political career he was also chairman (1960–1963) and president (1964–1966) of the British Travel Association.

Personal life
Lord Mabane was twice married. He married firstly Louise, daughter of E. Tanton, in 1918. They were divorced in 1926. He married secondly Stella Jane, daughter of J. Duggan, in 1944. He died in November 1969, aged 74. As he was childless, the barony became extinct upon his death.

References

External links 
 

1895 births
1969 deaths
Alumni of Gonville and Caius College, Cambridge
British Army personnel of World War I
East Yorkshire Regiment officers
Knights Commander of the Order of the British Empire
Liberal Party (UK) MPs for English constituencies
Members of the Privy Council of the United Kingdom
Ministers in the Churchill wartime government, 1940–1945
National Liberal Party (UK, 1931) politicians
People educated at Woodhouse Grove School
UK MPs 1931–1935
UK MPs 1935–1945
Ministers in the Churchill caretaker government, 1945
Ministers in the Chamberlain wartime government, 1939–1940
Ministers in the Chamberlain peacetime government, 1937–1939
Hereditary barons created by Elizabeth II